Yevgeni Sergeyevich Pchelintsev (born 6 November 1976) is a former Russian football player.

Honours
Dinamo Minsk
Belarusian Premier League bronze: 2000

References

1976 births
Living people
Russian footballers
Association football midfielders
Russian expatriate footballers
Expatriate footballers in Belarus
Russian Premier League players
FC Chernomorets Novorossiysk players
FC Dinamo Minsk players
FC Kuban Krasnodar players
FC Sheksna Cherepovets players